Niniche is a 1925 German silent comedy film directed by Victor Janson and starring Ossi Oswalda, Vivian Gibson and Livio Pavanelli.

The film's art direction was by Jacek Rotmil.

Cast
 Ossi Oswalda as Niniche
 Victor Janson as Jonathan Dickson
 Livio Pavanelli as Harald Cliffton
 Vivian Gibson
 Gerhard Ritterband as Emil

References

Bibliography
 Babett Stach & Helmut Morsbach. German film posters: 1895–1945. Walter de Gruyter, 1992.

External links

1925 films
1925 comedy films
German comedy films
Films of the Weimar Republic
German silent feature films
German black-and-white films
Films directed by Victor Janson
Silent comedy films
1920s German films
1920s German-language films